Lepidasthenia is a genus of marine Polychaete worms belonging to the family Polynoidae (scale worms). Species of Lepidasthenia are found world-wide to depths of about 1200 m but are more common in shallower water.

Description 

Lepidasthenia species are long-bodied scale worms with up to 150 segments and 50 to 100 or more pairs of elytra. The elytra are smooth, lack marginal papillae.  Elytra are small, do not overlap, and leave the dorsal region of the body mostly uncovered; on the posterior region there is one pair of elytra every three segments. The lateral antennae are inserted terminally on distal ends of the bilobed prostomium. The lateral and median antennae are smooth.  The first segment is without chaetae. Notopodia are reduced and notochaetae are few in number or more often entirely absent. The neuropodia are deeply divided vertically into anterior and posterior lobes.  The neurochaetae may be bidentate or unidentate and are few in number.

Biology 

Lepidasthenia is one of many genera in the family that contain bioluminescent species.

Species 

There are 42 valid species of Lepidasthenia as of September 2020:

References

Phyllodocida
Polychaete genera
Bioluminescent annelids